Georgios Anastassopoulos (25 September 1935 – 12 July 2019) was a Greek politician who served as a Member of the European Parliament (MEP).

Anastassopoulos was educated at the University of Athens where he studied law; and later at King's College London, where he studied comparative European law. He served three terms as MEP between 1984 and 1999. Between 1989 and 1999, he served four terms as Vice-President of the Assembly, and was also president of the parliament's Transport Committee. He was the permanent delegate to the UNESCO for Greece, and was elected president over the General Convention of UNESCO for 2007 and 2009.

He died on 12 July 2019 at the age of 83.

References

External links
 

1935 births
2019 deaths
Alumni of King's College London
National and Kapodistrian University of Athens alumni
MEPs for Greece 1984–1989
MEPs for Greece 1989–1994
MEPs for Greece 1994–1999
New Democracy (Greece) MEPs
Chevaliers of the Légion d'honneur
Panteion University alumni
Politicians from Athens